Oberea  is a species of longhorn beetle in the tribe Saperdini in the genus Oberea, discovered by Pic in 1923.

References

A
Beetles described in 1923